Mount Borgstrom is a mountain,  high, rising  southeast of Mount Meister on Nash Ridge of the Eisenhower Range, in Victoria Land. It was mapped by the United States Geological Survey from surveys and from U.S. Navy air photos, 1955–63, and named by the Advisory Committee on Antarctic Names for Commander Charles O. Borgstrom, an air operations officer with U.S. Navy Squadron VX-6 during Operation Deep Freeze 1966.

References 

Mountains of Victoria Land
Borchgrevink Coast
Two-thousanders of Antarctica